Skycrane or sky crane may refer to:

 a helicopter with a heavy-lifting capability
 Sikorsky S-64 Skycrane
 The Flying Crane, or Hughes XH-17
 a low-gravity landing mechanism used by
 Mars Science Laboratory#Sky crane landing
 Perseverance (rover)